Gardish is a 1993 Indian Hindi-language action crime film written and directed by Priyadarshan, starring Jackie Shroff, Aishwarya and Dimple Kapadia. It is a remake of the 1989 Malayalam film Kireedam. The film won two Filmfare AwardsBest Art Direction (Sabu Cyril) and Best Action (Thyagarajan), and was nominated for Best Actor (Jackie Shroff), Best Supporting Actor (Amrish Puri), and Best Supporting Actress (Dimple Kapadia). It marks the debut of actor Mukesh Rishi as an antagonist. Notably, this film also marks South Indian actress Aishwarya's (daughter of actress Lakshmi) Bollywood debut. The film was a critical and commercial success.

Story 
Naive and easily impressionable Vidya Bhalla (Aishwarya) would like her husband to be a dashing hero, one who is not afraid of anybody, one who can easily jump into a fire to rescue someone, one who is strong and romantic. She sees all of these qualities in Shiva Sathe (Jackie Shroff), the son of Constable Purushottam Sathe (Amrish Puri), whose only dream is to see Shiva become a Police Inspector. Vidya informs her father, Prithviraj Bhalla (Shammi Kapoor), that she has found her dream man; the Bhallas and the Sathes meet and get the couple formally engaged.

Then Purushottam arrests the son of a MLA and as a result he is transferred to the notorious Kala Chowki Police Station in Bombay. Upon arrival, he finds out that the Inspector in charge of the Police Station, Saini, has been severely beaten-up by don Billa Jilani (Mukesh Rishi) and is hospitalized. Purushottam arranges for his entire family to relocate.

The story takes a new twist. Shiva's brother-in-law approaches Prithviraj and informs him that Shiva has become an underworld don, after beating-up Billa Jilani, and now takes haftas and bribes. Prithviraj finds that Shiva has become a ruffian, and been arrested a number of times, much to the chagrin of his father. Prithviraj breaks off the alliance and informs Purushottam. Shortly thereafter, another fight breaks out and this time Shiva is arrested, held in a cell for several days, beaten up by his father and subsequently bailed out by a woman named Shanti (Dimple Kapadia). Eventually, Shiva kills Billa. The film ends with Purushottam declaring to Inspector Saini, that Shiva cannot be recommended to be an inspector, since in the eyes of the law he is a criminal. Shiva's photo is shown on the criminal's display board and credits roll.

Cast 
Shammi Kapoor as Prithviraj Bhalla 
Jackie Shroff as Shiva Sathe
Aishwarya as Vidya Bhalla
Dimple Kapadia as Shanti
Farida Jalal as Laxmi Sathe
Amrish Puri as Constable Purushottam Sathe
Raj Babbar as Pratap (special appearance)
Suresh Oberoi as Inspector Saini
Anant Mahadevan as Constable Sawant
Rakesh Bedi as Shiva's friend
Annu Kapoor as Shiva's friend
Asrani as Phoolwa's husband
Kunika as Phoolwa
Mukesh Rishi as Billa Jilani
Tej Sapru as Billa's henchman
Shagufta Ali as an Item Number in "Rang Rangeeli Raat Gaaye"

Music

Score 
The film score was composed by S. P. Venkatesh.

Songs 
The original songs featured in the film were composed by R. D. Burman along with renowned lyricist, Javed Akhtar.

Critical reception 
Mukul Kesavan from the magazine Manushi lauded Gardish as "a powerful, affecting film" The Indian Express praised the film's "script, vivid characters and powerful dialogues" and noted the actors' performances. Anurag Mathur of The Sunday Telegraph was critical of the film, dismissing it as "not even a film, but a series of action sequences strung together by guest appearances", although he singled out Kapadia for "excelling" in her part.

References

External links 
 

1990s Hindi-language films
1993 films
1993 crime thriller films
Indian thriller drama films
Films scored by R. D. Burman
Films directed by Priyadarshan
Hindi remakes of Malayalam films